The silvery greater galago (Otolemur monteiri) is a nocturnal primate from the galago family. It is usually found in Brachystegia woodland, from Angola to Tanzania, western Kenya and Rwanda.

The species was separated from the brown greater galago by Colin Groves in 2001.

Subspecies 
There are two recognised subspecies.
 Otolemur monteiri monteiri, found in more southerly regions
 Otolemur monteiri argentatus, from the Lake Victoria region

References

silvery greater galago
Mammals of Angola
Mammals of Tanzania
Mammals of Kenya
Mammals of Rwanda
Fauna of Southern Africa
silvery greater galago
silvery greater galago
Taxobox binomials not recognized by IUCN